Shorea cuspidata is a species of plant in the family Dipterocarpaceae. It is endemic to Borneo. It is listed on the IUCN Red List as Vulnerable, and populations are known to occur in the Bako and Lambir Hills.

References

cuspidata
Endemic flora of Borneo
Trees of Borneo
Taxonomy articles created by Polbot